McCluer High School is a high school located in Florissant, Missouri. It is a part of the Ferguson-Florissant School District. The principal is Cedric Gerald, and the school is the home of the McCluer Comets.

Pre-history
When McCluer opened in 1958, it was a junior high school. The history of McCluer goes back to the mid to late 19th century.

Ferguson School Central School 
Ferguson School Central School (now known as the Central Elementary School) located at 201 Wesley Avenue, opened in 1880 in the Ferguson Public School District, in Ferguson, Missouri. In 1903 the name of Ferguson School was changed to Central School. The high school students attending Central School transferred to the new John M. Vogt High School in 1930. 

Built as a grammar school building (grades 1-8) between 1877 and 1880, Expanded in 1903 to provide one of the first accredited four-year public high schools in St. Louis County, the building has been continuously used as a public school for over 100 years, maintaining its integrity of use. The original four room building remains intact as the core of the present elementary school (Central Elementary School) with additions dating from 1895, 1904, 1908, and 1925 to 1927.

The school is now called Central Elementary School. The school currently has 1,530 students enrolled. The building for the former Ferguson School Central School is listed as one of the National Register of Historic Places listings in St. Louis County, Missouri, since 1984.

John M. Vogt High School 
John M. Vogt High School is located at 200 Church Avenue in Ferguson, Missouri and named for a merchant and former school board member. The school opened in 1930. It was built on the grounds of an open-air theater; property which was donated to the Ferguson Public School District by the Community Hall Association. John M. Vogt High School was the first building in the Ferguson School District to be used strictly for high school students. The new high school opened with students that had transferred from Central School. Now Vogt Elementary School, John M. Vogt High School's yearbook, which began in 1931, was named the "Crest". Due to redistricting, Vogt school is planning to close by the beginning of the 2019 school district. The idea to keep Vogt school open as the new STEAM High school was an option, but McCluer South Berkeley is the likely candidate for the new STEAM High school, which would leave Vogt Elementary to close.

Ferguson High School 
Ferguson High School, with 400 students that transferred from John M. Vogt High School, Ferguson High School opened in 1939. It was built by the Ferguson Public School District on the (rumored to be haunted) January Estate; which had also been used as the city dump and was known as Blizzard Hill. Located at 701 January Avenue, the school was constructed with WPA, Works Progress Administration, financial assistance. In the basement of the school was a firing range for target practice by students belonging to the school's NRA Club. 1952 saw the merger of the Ferguson Public School District and the Florissant School District. Ferguson High School's last graduating class was in 1962; with the school becoming Ferguson Junior High; now Ferguson Middle School. Perhaps you were a camper or a counselor there in the summer at Camp Comet! The Ferguson High School's yearbook was named the "Crest".

History 
McCluer High School, located at 1896 South New Florissant Road, Florissant, Missouri, the school opened in 1957 as a junior high school as a part of the Ferguson Florissant School District. In 1962, when Ferguson High School closed, its students moved to McCluer; now McCluer Senior High School. McCluer's mascot is the Comets. 

In 1971, McCluer had more than 4,500 students even though the school was built to handle 3,300.  To handle extra student, there were two sessions every day, with class beginning at 6:45 and ending at 5:30. The school colors are red, white, and blue. The name of the school newspaper is The Daily Comet and McCluer High School's yearbook is named the "Crest".

McCluer High School was named for Virgil C. McCluer, superintendent of the Ferguson School District for 30 years until he retired in 1964.

Notable alumni
 Gwen Berry, US track and field
 Ralph Eberhart (1964), retired USAF 4-star general
 Michael McDonald (1970), American singer and songwriter, winner of five Grammy Awards
 Steve Pisarkiewicz (1972), former professional American football quarterback
 Tyron Woodley (2000), 2x NCAA Division I All-American wrestler; current mixed martial artist in the Welterweight division and champion for the Ultimate Fighting Championship
Carl Reed (1998), Academy Award-winning producer, director, Founder of Lion Forge Animation and Composition Media
 Dan O'Bannon (1964), screenwriter and actor for A-List movies like Alien
Keyon Harrold (1999), American jazz trumpeter, vocalist, songwriter, and producer

References

External links
 Older McCluer High School website

High schools in St. Louis County, Missouri
Public high schools in Missouri